Richelieu is a city in Rouville Regional County Municipality, in the province of Quebec, Canada. The population as of the Canada 2021 Census was 5,742. Its name comes from the fact that it lies along the Richelieu River.

Demographics 

Population trend:

(+) Amalgamated with Municipality of Notre-Dame-de-Bon-Secours on March 15, 2000.

Mother tongue language (2006)

Transportation
The CIT Chambly-Richelieu-Carignan provides commuter and local bus services.

Education

The South Shore Protestant Regional School Board previously served the municipality.

See also
List of cities in Quebec
Municipal history of Quebec

References

External links
 Richelieu official website

Cities and towns in Quebec
Incorporated places in Rouville Regional County Municipality
Greater Montreal